"Rainy Days and Mondays" is a 1971 song by the Carpenters, with instrumental backing by L.A. session musicians from the Wrecking Crew, that went to number 2 on the Billboard Hot 100 chart. It's Too Late/I Feel the Earth Move by Carole King kept it from number 1. "Rainy Days and Mondays" was the duo's fourth number 1 song on the Adult Contemporary singles chart. However, the song failed to chart in the United Kingdom until it went to number 63 in a reissue there in 1993. "Rainy Days and Mondays" was certified Gold by the RIAA.

The song was composed in 1971 by Roger Nichols and Paul Williams. It was released as the first track on the album Carpenters, popularly known as the Tan Album, and the B-side on the single is "Saturday", written and sung by Richard Carpenter.

Personnel
 Karen Carpenter - lead and backing vocals
 Richard Carpenter - backing vocals, piano, Wurlitzer electric piano, orchestration
 Joe Osborn - bass guitar
 Hal Blaine - drums
 Tommy Morgan - harmonica
 Bob Messenger - tenor saxophone

Chart performance

Weekly charts

Year-end charts

Compilations
 Yesterday Once More
 From the Top
 Interpretations
 Love Songs
 The Essential Collection
 Carpenters: Gold 35th Anniversary Edition

See also
 List of number-one adult contemporary singles of 1971 (U.S.)

References

External links
 

1971 singles
Songs written by Paul Williams (songwriter)
Songs written by Roger Nichols (songwriter)
The Carpenters songs
Andy Williams songs
A&M Records singles
1971 songs